Erik Němec (born 21 December 1993) is a Czech ice hockey forward currently playing for Orli Znojmo of the Austrian Hockey League.

References

External links
 

1993 births
Living people
HC Vítkovice players
Czech ice hockey forwards
Orli Znojmo players
Czech expatriate ice hockey people
Czech expatriate sportspeople in Poland
Expatriate ice hockey players in Poland
MKS Cracovia (ice hockey) players